Maresa may refer to:

 a synonym for the termite genus Reticulitermes
 Maresa (company), a former Spanish company of pinball machines

See also 
 Mareşal (disambiguation)
 Marisa (disambiguation)